On November 7, 2018, Sky Lease Cargo Flight 4854 was a flight served by a Boeing 747-412F which overran the runway at Halifax Stanfield International Airport, Nova Scotia due to pilot error and fatigue. The incident injured three crew members.

Aircraft and flight 

N908AR was an American registered Boeing 747-412F (serial no. 28026) that served Flight 4854 on November 7, 2018. The aircraft was delivered new to Singapore Airlines Cargo and registered as 9V-SFF, before Sky Lease Cargo acquired it in April of 2017. The aircraft did not have any cargo aboard. There was a crew of 3 and 1 passenger, an off-duty captain who was deadheading. Flight 4854's route took it from Chicago O'Hare Intl. Airport to Halifax Stanfield Intl. Airport at which it would taken on cargo. It would continue to Ted Stevens Anchorage International Airport to refuel and change crews and depart for its final destination of Changsha Huanghua International Airport.

Incident 
The crew flew the instrument landing system (ILS) approach for Runway 14. 81 seconds from the runway threshold, the pilots noticed a tailwind. The crew continued the approach without recalculating the performance data to confirm that the stopping distance was sufficient; possibly due to the short time until landing. The tailwind they encountered increased the 747's stopping distance but it did not exceed the length of the runway. 

The plane touched down at 0506 Atlantic Standard Time, during dark hours. After touching down, the throttle for Engine 1 was moved up, past the idle position. This resulted in the autobrakes to disengage and the spoilers to retract. The 4.5° right crab angle, the crosswinds faced on landing and asymmetric thrust caused the aircraft to drift right of the centerline. The pilot's attention was tightly focused on the lateral movement, rather than deceleration. Thus, vital callouts were never made. Although, manual braking was applied 8 seconds after touching down, maximum braking did not occur until 15 seconds later. The plane was just 800 feet (244m) from the end of Runway 14. 

Five seconds later, Flight 4854 sped off the end of the asphalt at 77 knots and slid down an embankment. The nose and body landing gears collapsed and Engines 2 and 3 were ripped from each wing. The aircraft finally came to rest, in a grassy area just short of a public road about 544 feet (166m) past the end of Runway 14. All three crew members were slightly injured. The passenger did not receive any injuries.

Investigation  
It was discovered that the crew had not received enough restorative rest in the 24-hour lead up to the accident. This factor combined with the timing of the flight, would have significantly degraded the pilots' decision making and overall performance. This would have added to the confusion and slowed reaction times of the crew to initiate a go around or to catch each other's mistakes including the disengaging autobrakes. Another contributing factor was the pilots not choosing the easier approach for Runway 23. This was a longer runway perpendicular to Runway 14. At the time of the accident, the first 1767 ft (538m) of Runway 23 was closed due to light and marking work. The Notice to Airmen (NOTAM) the crew received stated "NOT AUTH" in reference to Runway 23. This may have led the crew to believe the entire runway was closed. Even with the closed section, Runway 23 was still longer than Runway 14.

Aftermath  
The 747-400F involved (N908AR) was damaged beyond repair and was written off. The crew  were sent to hospital for their injuries . The uninjured passenger was also taken for assessment as a precaution. No crew members faced criminal charges. This incident is the most recent 747 hull loss during flight (not while stored).

See also 
 American Airlines Flight 1420
 Boeing 747 hull losses
 Lion Air Flight 538
 Qantas Flight 1
 Southwest Airlines Flight 1248
 Southwest Airlines Flight 1455

References 

Aviation accidents and incidents in 2018
Accidents and incidents involving the Boeing 747
Aviation accidents and incidents in Canada
Halifax Stanfield International Airport